John Wilton (fl. 1414–1417) of Hereford was an English politician.

He was a Member (MP) of the Parliament of England for Hereford in April 1414 and 1417.

References

14th-century births
15th-century deaths
English MPs April 1414
People from Hereford
English MPs 1417